James Davidson Tillman (November 25, 1841 – June 16, 1916) was a colonel during the American Civil War, Tennessee State Senator and US Minister to Ecuador.

Early life
James Davidson Tillman, son of Lewis Tillman (1816–1886) and Mary Catherine Davidson Tillman (1823–1902)  was born in Bedford County, Tennessee on November 25, 1841. Among his brothers was Samuel Escue Tillman, a West Point graduate and long time professor there, who served as Superintendent during World War I. He completed his law degree at Cumberland University on the eve of the Civil War.

Career
During the American Civil War, he served in the Confederate States Army as a colonel in the 41st Tennessee Regiment and later in the Tennessee Consolidated Regiment. After the war he served terms as a Tennessee State Senator before being appointed by President Grover Cleveland as the US Minister to Ecuador from 1895 to 1897.

Death
He died in Fayetteville, Tennessee on June 16, 1916. He is interred at the Rose Hill Cemetery in Fayetteville, TN.

References

1841 births
1916 deaths
19th-century American politicians
Ambassadors of the United States to Ecuador
Confederate States Army officers
People from Bedford County, Tennessee
People of Tennessee in the American Civil War
Democratic Party Tennessee state senators